Eino Sirén (25 December 1909, Helsinki – 4 March 1981) was a Finnish lawyer and politician of the Social Democratic Party of Finland. He served as a member of the Parliament of Finland from 1962 to 1970 and as President of the Nordic Council in 1967.

References

1909 births
1981 deaths
Politicians from Helsinki
People from Uusimaa Province (Grand Duchy of Finland)
Social Democratic Party of Finland politicians
Members of the Parliament of Finland (1962–66)
Members of the Parliament of Finland (1966–70)